Lars Christiansen may refer to:

Lars Christiansen (radio personality), American radio personality on WZNX
Lars Christiansen (handballer) (born 1972), Danish team handball player
Lars Christiansen (politician) in New Hampshire House of Representatives
Lars Christiansen (sailor) from List of World Championships medalists in sailing (keelboat classes)